MassKara Festival Queen 2012 was the 32nd edition of the MassKara Festival Queen pageant held on October 18, 2012, at the University of St. La Salle Gymnasium in Bacolod City, Philippines. Ena Louis Velasco, a 4th year BS Biology of University of St. La Salle was crowned at the end of the event.

Final Results

Special Awards

Contestants

Other Pageant Notes

Judges
 Patricia Tumulak - Binibining Pilipinas 2011 Semi-Finalist, and Miss Philippines Earth 2009 Miss Fire
 Maggie Limjap - Former Beauty Queen
 Harold Geronimo - Director of Strategic Marketing and Communications of Megaworld Corporation
 Alex Gonzales Soncio - Chairman; Miss Iloilo Dinagyang
 Ivy Visitacion - lifestyle Columnist - Visayan Daily Star 
 Rene Hinojales - Director - Lin-ay sang Negros
 Jed Patrick Mabilog - Mayor - Iloilo City
 Agrimero Cruz - Regional Director - Western Visayas Police Office

Pre-and-Post Pageant Notes

 Tanya Molenaar was Miss World Philippines 2012 contestant.
 Samyah Al-Dossary went on to represent Bacolod City in Lin-ay sang Negros 2013 and was crowned the winner.

See also
 MassKara Festival

References

Beauty pageants in the Philippines